The Greatest Show on Earth: The  Evidence for Evolution is a 2009 book by British biologist Richard Dawkins, which was released on 3 September 2009 in the UK and on 22 September 2009 in the US. It sets out the evidence for biological evolution, and is Dawkins's 10th book, following his best-selling critique of religion The God Delusion (2006) and The Ancestor's Tale (2004), which traced human ancestry back to the dawn of life.

The book is published in the United Kingdom and Commonwealth nations by Transworld, and in the United States by Free Press. In its first week of release, it topped The Sunday Times''' Bestseller list, with more than twice the sales of its nearest competitor. An audiobook version has also been released, read by Dawkins and his wife Lalla Ward.

Background

Richard Dawkins has written a number of books about evolution, beginning with The Selfish Gene (1976) and The Extended Phenotype (1982). These he followed with three books that attempted to address common misunderstandings about evolution. His documentary series The Genius of Charles Darwin looks at Darwin's life and some of the evidence for evolution.

However, when he looked back at the work he had published, he felt that he had never comprehensively addressed the evidence of common descent. Dawkins believed that opposition to evolution was as strong as ever, despite the overwhelming, and growing, body of evidence for the theory. He started writing The Greatest Show on Earth during his final months as Charles Simonyi Professor for the Public Understanding of Science (Marcus du Sautoy now holds the position) and finished it in retirement. He thought that 2009, the bicentennial of Darwin's birth and 150th anniversary of his book On the Origin of Species, was the perfect time for such a work. Other authors have written similar books recently, such as Jerry Coyne's Why Evolution is True which Dawkins highly recommends.

Dawkins's literary agent John Brockman promoted the book to publishers under the working title Only a Theory. However, American biologist Kenneth Miller had already used that title for his own book, Only a Theory: Evolution and the Battle for America's Soul (2008). He kept "Only a Theory?" as the title for the first chapter, "with a precautionary question mark to guard against creationist quote-mining".Education: Questionable foundations: Providing millions of pounds to schools to teach creationism is dangerous, say atheist Richard Dawkins and Richard Harries, the Bishop of Oxford (Times article referred to in the first chapter by Dawkins and Richard Harries.) 20 June 2004 Dawkins got the title from a T-shirt given to him by "an anonymous well-wisher" which bears the words "Evolution: The Greatest Show on Earth; the Only Game in Town". He wore it occasionally when giving lectures, and realised it was ideal for a title. However, since his editor would not permit such a long title, they shortened it to The Greatest Show on Earth. On three occasions, Dawkins wanted to include new scientific findings that emerged late in the publishing process; despite the disruption, the publisher accommodated them.

Dawkins dedicated the book to Josh Timonen, who worked with others to build the website RichardDawkins.net. Dawkins writes in the preface: "Josh's creative talent runs deep, but the image of the iceberg captures neither the versatile breadth of his contributions to our joint endeavour, nor the warm good humour with which he makes them." Dawkins also thanks his wife Lalla's "unfailing encouragement, helpful stylistic criticisms and characteristically stylish suggestions", and his friend Charles Simonyi as he signs off after fourteen years and seven books.

Synopsis

The book is divided into 13 chapters spanning over 400 pages, and includes an appendix called "The history-deniers" in the end material.

Only a theory? (nature of scientific theory and fallibility)
Dogs, cows and cabbages (artificial selection)
The primrose path to macro-evolution
Silence and slow time (age of the Earth and the geologic time scale)
Before our very eyes (examples of evolution observed)
Missing link? What do you mean, 'missing'? (the fossil record)
Missing persons? Missing no longer (human evolution)
You did it yourself in nine months (a statement attributed to J. B. S. Haldane; discusses developmental biology)
The ark of the continents (biogeography and plate tectonics)
The tree of cousinship (the tree of life, homology and analogy)
History written all over us (vestigiality and unintelligent design)
Arms races and 'evolutionary theodicy' (coevolution and evolutionary arms races)
There is grandeur in this view of life (based on the final passage of On the Origin of Species)

Critical reception
The book received mixed to positive critical reception on its release. Writing in The Times, Anjana Ahuja described Dawkins's account of the evidence for evolution as "fine, lucid and convincing". Though she criticised him for aggrandising the role of Islam in the spread of creationism and suggested that his writing style is unlikely to persuade disbelievers, Ahuja described these as merely "quibbles" and recommended the book to all readers. The Economist also featured a favourable review, praising Dawkins's writing style as "persuasive" and lauding its educational value. Mark Fisher in The List called Dawkins a "compelling communicator", adding that the book was "illuminating" and praising the use of humorous anecdotes throughout. The Sunday Telegraph awarded it "Book of the Week", with reviewer Simon Ings describing Dawkins as a "master of scientific clarity and wit". Although Ings felt that anger had interfered with Dawkins's creativity to an extent, he also praised sections of the book as "magical" and "visceral", concluding that there was a "timeless merit" to the overall theme.Review and Summary for the Reports of the National Center for Science Education by Douglas Theobald  2009Video: Richard Dawkins on The Greatest Show on Earth: Richard Dawkins talks about why it's time for a book setting out the evidence for evolution, when calling someone ignorant isn't an insult, and how the media have made him into a militant atheist 21 September 2009The New York Times reviewer Nicholas Wade, while praising the work overall, criticised Dawkins's assertion that evolution can be treated as an undeniable fact and asserted that Dawkins's insistence that it is a fact makes him as dogmatic as his opponents. Moreover, characterising his opponents as "history-deniers," "worse than ignorant" and "deluded to the point of perversity" Wade asserts, "is not the language of science, or civility." Wade sees both Dawkins and his creationist opponents as wrong. Wade's review was subsequently criticised in numerous letters to The New York Times. In one, Daniel Dennett asserted that creationism deserves as much respect as believing that the world is flat. Another letter, from Philip Kitcher, Professor of Philosophy at Columbia University, asserted that evolution and other scientific findings "are so well supported that they count as facts".

See also
Creation–evolution controversy
E. coli long-term evolution experiment – discussed in detail in chapter 5
Great chain of being
Guppy (Poecilia reticulata'') – example of evolution observed
Domesticated silver fox
Evidence of common descent
Wendy Wright (activist)
Endless Forms Most Beautiful – "The Greatest Show on Earth" song in the album contains quotes from the book read personally by Richard Dawkins himself.

References

External links

The Greatest Show on Earth  at RichardDawkins.net (includes a video and links to abstracts from the first two chapters as well as extensive links to book reviews and media coverage)

2009 non-fiction books
Books about evolution
Books by Richard Dawkins
Criticism of creationism
English-language books
English non-fiction books
Free Press (publisher) books
Popular science books
Scientific skepticism mass media
Transworld Publishers books